The 2003–04 Belarusian Extraliga season was the 12th season of the Belarusian Extraliga, the top level of ice hockey in Belarus. Ten teams participated in the league, and HK Yunost Minsk won the championship.

Regular season

Playoffs
Quarterfinals
HK Keramin Minsk - HK Vitebsk 2-0 on series
HC Dinamo Minsk - HK Neman Grodno 2-0 on series
HK Gomel - Khimik Novopolotsk 2-0 on series
HK Yunost Minsk - HK Khimvolokno Mogilev 2-0 on series
Semifinals
HK Keramin Minsk - HC Dinamo Minsk 3-0 on series
HK Yunost Minsk - HK Gomel 3-2 on series
Final
HK Yunost Minsk - HK Keramin Minsk 3-0 on series
3rd place
HK Gomel - HC Dinamo Minsk 3-1 on series

External links 
 Season on hockeyarchives.info

Belarusian Extraleague
Belarusian Extraleague seasons
Extra